Huron Shores is a Municipality in the Canadian province of Ontario, located along the North Channel of Lake Huron in the Algoma District.

The municipality was created in 1999 through the amalgamation of the former townships of Thessalon, Thompson, and Day and Bright Additional, and the former village of Iron Bridge. The town of Thessalon, although surrounded by Huron Shores, is not part of the Municipality.

The township's current mayor is Gil Reeves, who succeeded Ted Linley in the 2010 municipal election.

Communities 
The main communities in the township are Iron Bridge, Sowerby and Little Rapids. Smaller communities include Ansonia, Day Mills, Dayton, Dean Lake, Eley, Livingstone, Livingstone Creek, Maple Ridge, Nestorville, Sherwood and Sunset Beach.

The municipality officers are located in Iron Bridge, which was originally named Tally-Ho for the call that the lumberjacks would make upon reaching a trading post, Iron Bridge was renamed in the early 1900s after the bridge built over the nearby Mississagi River. Its most notable tourist attractions are its snowmobile trails, nearby wilderness areas for hunting and fishing, and the Voyageur Hiking Trail which passes through the town of Iron Bridge.

As a formerly independent village, Iron Bridge retains the status of designated place in Canadian censuses. It had a population of 632 in the Canada 2011 Census, up from 614 in the 2006 census.

Recreation
The municipality has numerous recreation centres and community halls which are used frequently for local events. These centres are located throughout the municipality and include:
 Thessalon Township Community Centre
 Little Rapids Gazebo and Ballpark softball field with gazebo shelter
 Sowerby Hall
 Historic Cordukes/Weber 12-Sided Barn
 Iron Bridge Recreation Centre (Arena)
 Thompson Hall Community Gym

Many of these community centres have significant historical connections.  The Thessalon Township Community Centre is the former Little Rapids one-room school house.  The Cordukes/Weber 12-Sided Barn is one of only three 12-sided barns in Canada.  It was originally built in 1919 and was restored and relocated to its present site in 2010.

Huron Shores is home to two museums.  The Iron Bridge Historical Museum and the Heritage Park Museum.  The Iron Bridge Historical Museum located in Iron Bridge is dedicated to preserving the heritage of the town and the surrounding communities which make up Huron Shores.  The Museum is open seasonally in July and August and consists of a number of historical buildings from the area including two pioneer log houses.

The Heritage Park Museum located in Little Rapids, Ontario was established in 1977 to preserve the heritage of the Huron Shores region.  The heritage site is open in July and August and is well known locally for its annual county fair and auction which occurs every civic holiday weekend. The Museum is operated by the Thessalon Township Heritage Committee, a committee within the municipality of Huron Shores.

There is a substantial farming community in Huron Shores.  During the summer months many local farmers and food producers participate in local farmers' markets held at the 12-sided Round Barn heritage site and the Iron Bridge Historical Museum.

The municipality is also home to a number of publicly accessible lakes and rivers.  The outdoors are one of the main attractions of the area with many visitors coming to the area to fish, hunt, or enjoy the water. It includes several islands, including Clinton Island.

Demographics 

Population:
 Population in 2016: 1,664
 Population in 2011: 1,723
 Population in 2006: 1,696
 Population in 2001: 1,794
 Population total in 1996: 1,877
 Day and Bright Additional: 217
 Iron Bridge: 777
 Thessalon: 758
 Thompson: 125
 Population in 1991:
 Day and Bright Additional: 249
 Iron Bridge: 823
 Thessalon: 771
 Thompson: 119

Languages:
 English as first language: 94.0%
 French as first language: 5.7%
 English and French as first language: 0%
 Other as first language: 0.3%

See also
List of townships in Ontario

References

External links 

1999 establishments in Ontario
Municipalities in Algoma District
Single-tier municipalities in Ontario